Nuneaton Bridge was a railway station in Nuneaton which was located between  and . The station appeared in working timetables between 1866 and 1887.

References

Disused railway stations in Warwickshire
Former Midland Railway stations
Railway stations in Great Britain opened in 1866
Railway stations in Great Britain closed in 1887